The Thacher School is an elite private co-educational boarding school in Ojai, California. Founded in 1889 as a boys' school, it is now the oldest co-educational boarding school in California. Girls were first admitted in 1977. The first co-ed graduating class was the class of 1978.

Notable programs
All students are required to ride and care for a horse during their first year. An annual gymkhana event gives students an opportunity to demonstrate their horsemanship in competition with each other. Throughout the year, students are encouraged to take weekend camping trips into the local mountains. And each fall and spring the whole school breaks into small groups for week-long trips that may include backpacking, rock climbing, cycling, sailing, horse camping, canyoneering, backcountry skiing and kayaking. There is also horseback riding.

On November 8, 2004, the San Jose Mercury News reported that the school received its largest alumni donation ever from Owen Jameson.  The $10 million gift was part of the $82 million Campaign For Thacher, concluded in 2007, that sought to improve Thacher's financial aid program and facilities, and raise its faculty salaries and endowment.  Jameson's donation was specifically directed towards expanding Thacher's scholarship opportunities for youths from minority or low-income families.

History and culture
Sherman Day Thacher did not arrive on the Casa de Piedra ranch with the intent of creating a school. The son of Yale professor Thomas Anthony Thacher and the former Elizabeth Baldwin Sherman (a granddaughter of Founding Father Roger Sherman), he elected to move to California to care for his brother who needed the "fresh air" cure for his tuberculosis. While spending time on the ranch, Thacher was contacted by an old Yale colleague who had a son who desperately wanted to go to Yale but needed tutoring before he would be prepared to attend.  Thacher accepted the offer and tutored his colleague's son in both academics and maturity with his unique method of blending studies with outdoor living and horsemanship.  Soon other friends were sending their sons out to California to receive Thacher's instruction and a school was born. Though it began as a feeder school to Yale, students were also attracted by the "emphasis on the lessons of the outdoors, hiking and rafting and riding on horseback" and "nearly every boy has a horse of his own and takes full care of it".

Sexual misconduct investigation 
In a report posted on the Thacher website on June 16, 2021 the school publicly acknowledged decades of student sexual misconduct, harassment and “boundary crossing” (including violent rapes) by faculty members. The 91-page report compiled by attorneys hired by Thacher "laid out episodes of alleged rape, groping, unwanted touching and inappropriate comments dating back 40 years in a level of detail surprising for a private institution," according to the Los Angeles Times. The document identified six alleged perpetrators by name, recounted accusations of misconduct and alleged efforts by former school administrators to cover up complaints and blame teenage victims. Thacher's board of trustees concluded, among other findings, that many students "suffered lasting harm not just from the sexual misconduct itself but also from the School’s handling of the misconduct." The board also concluded that the school "tolerated and at times fostered a culture that valued the experiences and voices of boys and men over those of girls and women and that allowed sexual misconduct to be minimized, ignored, and dismissed."

The allegations, per further reporting in the Times, "sparked a broad criminal inquiry" by the Ventura County Sheriff's Office. "Investigators were examining potential sex crimes as well as whether Thacher administrators committed crimes by not alerting police to suspected child abuse, according to the Sheriff’s Office."

On July 28, 2021 the Thacher Board of Trustees unanimously voted to remove the name of its former head of school from the campus dining hall and athletic field. In a letter to the school community, board chair Dan Yih wrote that “the high honor associated with a name on a building is fundamentally inconsistent with the gravity and serious consequences of Michael Mulligan’s failure to protect Thacher students from harm.” The Trustees also voted to remove former headmaster Bill Wyman’s name from a hiking trail named for him. Wyman, who served as headmaster at the school from 1975 to 1992 and died in 2014, had engaged in “a pattern of offensive verbal conduct and improper touching” toward female students and staff. Wyman resigned after the discovery.

In March of 2022, Head of School Blossom Pidduck announced that she would be taking a leave of absence through the summer. In a letter addressed to the Thacher community, the administrator wrote that she had not been prepared for the personal ramifications that would come with Thacher's investigation of historic sexual misconduct. Pidduck stated that she wanted to spend time healing from sexual trauma she experienced in her own time as a Thacher student in the early 1990s.

Campus and facilities
The campus, located in the foothills in the northeast corner of the Ojai Valley, about 85 miles north of Los Angeles, was originally the Casa de Piedra ranch. Buildings reflect a variety of architectural styles, including California Craftsman and Spanish Colonial Revival. An $82-million capital campaign that concluded in 2007 was responsible for adding a new performing arts center and a student commons, two new dormitories, faculty housing, and numerous other improvements. In addition to the normal boarding school mix of athletic facilities (gymnasium, tennis courts, track, three fields, fitness center, and pool, although the pool is not used for athletic events), the campus has barns, pastures, arenas, and fields for equestrian use, including a network of trails that links the campus to the adjacent Los Padres National Forest.

The school also maintains base camps in the Sespe Wilderness and the Eastern Sierra's Golden Trout Wilderness, which it uses for backcountry trips, educational programs and alumni retreats.

Mascot and traditions
While The Thacher School's symbol has always been that of the Pegasus, its mascot is the toad.

Notable alumni
Phil Angelides, 31st California State Treasurer
Riley P. Bechtel, Bechtel CEO
Laurel Braitman, science historian, writer, and TED Fellow
Rukmini Maria Callimachi, journalist and poet
Donald Cooksey, physicist
Jennifer Crittenden, television writer (The Simpsons, Everybody Loves Raymond, Seinfeld)
Paul B. Fay, Jr., businessman and adviser to President John F. Kennedy
Sidney D. Gamble, renowned photographer and sociologist of early 20th century China
Glen David Gold, author of Carter Beats the Devil, Sunnyside, and I Will Be Complete: A Memoir.
James Newton Howard, composer
Ye Htoon, Burmese lawyer and political dissident
Howard Hughes, aviator and industrialist. Thacher was the second prep school that he attended. He enrolled when he and his parents moved to California, and he was still at Thacher when his mother died.
Roger Kent, Naval officer and political advisor
Sherman Kent, intelligence analyst
D. Andrew Kille, writer, teacher, and scholar of psychological biblical criticism
Josh Klausner, screenwriter and director (Date Night, Shrek Forever After, Wanderland)
Michael E. Knight, actor (All My Children)
 Sarah Konrad, Olympian: the first American woman to compete in two different disciplines at the same Winter Olympics (United States at the 2006 Winter Olympics).
John Lenczowski, founder and president of The Institute of World Politics
Norman Livermore, environmentalist, lumberman and official serving under Governor Ronald Reagan.
J.P. Manoux, actor (Aaron Stone)
John Wescott Myers, World War II test pilot
Charles Nordhoff, co-author of Mutiny on the Bounty
Wheeler J. North. marine biologist
Leland Orser, actor (Taken)
William Horsley Orrick Jr., United States federal judge
Clay Pell
Joely Richardson, actress (Nip/Tuck)
Matt Shakman, director
Jonathan Tucker, actor (Justified)
Charles L. Tutt, III, engineer and hotelier
Thornton Wilder, one of Thacher's most notable alumni, playwright and author. He began writing plays while at Thacher.
Barry Wood, College Football Hall of Fame inductee
Noah Wyle, television actor (ER)

Notable faculty
 Stacy Margolin (born 1959), tennis player

References

External links
The Thacher School - Website
ToadBlogs - Student Stories from The Thacher School
The Thacher School - Unofficial Profile
Chris Schedler: Teaching at Thacher, a reminiscence
Thacher School review by Scripps College student

High schools in Ventura County, California
Boarding schools in California
Ojai, California
Private high schools in California
1889 establishments in California
Educational institutions established in 1889